Tim Brewster (born October 13, 1960) is an American football coach and former player who is currently the tight ends coach for the University of Colorado. He also served as the tight ends coach and recruiting coordinator for the North Carolina Tar Heels football program. He was the head coach of the University of Minnesota from 2007 until he was fired midway through the Golden Gophers' 2010 season. In 2011, Brewster was a sideline analyst for Fox College Football and the NFL on Fox with Gus Johnson and Charles Davis.

Playing career
As a football player born and raised in Phillipsburg, New Jersey, U.S. and coming out of Phillipsburg High School, Brewster was a hybrid somewhere between a wide receiver and a tight end.  He enrolled at Pasadena City College, at the time a major junior college program, and was recruited along with five other players to transfer to the University of Illinois where they were looking to involve the tight end more heavily in their offensive scheme.  At Illinois he was a two-time All-Big Ten Conference selection as a tight end. At the end of his first season he played against the University of Alabama in the 1982 Liberty Bowl, which was Bear Bryant's final game. In his final season he captained the Illini during their run to the 1984 Rose Bowl. He was a player at Illinois at the same time former Minnesota Vikings head coach Brad Childress was an assistant coach.  He graduated with a degree in political science.  The Illinois program named him one of the Fighting Illini's ten greatest receivers in 2008. Following his college career, he made an unsuccessful attempt at establishing a professional playing career in the NFL.  He was cut during training camp for both the 1984 New York Giants and the 1985 Philadelphia Eagles.

Coaching career

High school
Brewster began his coaching career as a graduate assistant for Purdue University in 1986 under Leon Burtnett.  Burtnett was fired in the middle of the season.  Brewster then went to work as a car salesman, an experience he described as the "most miserable experience in my whole life."  Soon afterwards he was hired as head coach at Central Catholic High School in Lafayette, Indiana.  Legendary coach Bear Bryant, when they met in 1982, advised him, after hearing of his interest in coaching, to coach high school and "really learn the game."  During his two years there (1987–1988), he directed a pass-heavy, wide-open offense that enabled its quarterback to lead the state of Indiana in passing both years.  His record at CCHS was 15-8.

Early college
Brewster resumed his college career under then-University of North Carolina head coach Mack Brown (driving to Chapel Hill and convincing Brown to hire him as an unpaid volunteer assistant for the 1989 season).  He gained a full-time job before the following season, and served as a special teams coach, tight ends coach, and recruiting coordinator under Brown.

When Brown was hired as head coach at the University of Texas following the 1997 season, Brewster followed him and worked as tight ends coach from 1998-2001.  As a recruiter for Texas, he helped land a number of highly touted players, including Vince Young.

National Football League
After 13 years with Mack Brown, Brewster decided to try coaching in the National Football League to "enhance my Xs and Os [. . .] and study the game at a level without distractions" that come with college players and NCAA requirements. Brewster gained his first NFL coaching experience when he was hired as the tight ends coach for the San Diego Chargers, a position he held from 2002 to 2004.  He is credited with the rapid ascent of Antonio Gates, who went from an undrafted free agent in 2003 to a first-team All-Pro and Pro Bowl selection in 2004, only his second year in the NFL.  Brewster was held in such high esteem by his peers that he served as assistant head coach during the 2004 season.  He was hired by the Denver Broncos as their tight ends coach prior to the 2005 season, and served in that capacity for two seasons before moving on to the University of Minnesota.

Minnesota
On January 15, 2007 it was reported on ESPN.com that Brewster was the choice of University of Minnesota athletic director Joel Maturi to replace Glen Mason as the Gophers head coach.  Various local news outlets, including WCCO and the Star Tribune, could not confirm the veracity of the report.  The following day, January 16, Minnesota associate athletic director Tom Wistrcill confirmed that Brewster was indeed the university's choice, with the contract signed in the early morning. He was officially presented as the new head coach on Wednesday, January 17 at the McNamara Alumni Center on the University of Minnesota campus.  At his first press conference, Brewster stated that his long-term goal for the program was to "win the Big Ten championship" and "take the Gopher Nation back to Pasadena."

Brewster signed a five-year contract worth : $400,000 in base salary, $400,000 in supplemental salary and $200,000 in deferred compensation that will vest after his contract expires.  Additionally, he can earn up to $700,000 in annual bonuses if the Gophers reach several goals including: win the Big Ten title ($200,000; $75,000 for second place), the national championship game ($300,000 for reaching the game; an additional $50,000 for winning), any non-title BCS bowl game ($200,000; $100,000 for each bowl game played on New Year's Day or after that is not a BCS game; $25,000 for pre-New Year's Day bowl games), as well as reaching maximum goals in two academic categories, the Academic Progress Report (up to $50,000) and sixth-year graduation rates (up to $100,000 for 75%).  He decided not to retain any of his predecessor's assistant coaches.

After a dismal start to the 2010 season which had featured four straight home losses, fans and media openly speculated that Tim Brewster would not coach at Minnesota past the 2010 season.  Early in that season, University President Robert Bruininks publicly criticized the current state of football under Coach Brewster when he told the Minnesota Daily, "We need a stronger football program here at the University of Minnesota." On September 11, 2010, Minnesota lost a home game to the South Dakota Coyotes, a Division I FCS team, by a score of 41-38.  The last time the Coyotes defeated the Golden Gophers in a football contest prior to that was on September 28, 1912.

Brewster was relieved of his head coaching position and had his contract terminated on October 17, 2010. As stipulated in his contract, Brewster received a $600,000 buyout. Joel Maturi commented that "While I appreciate the passion and commitment that Coach Brewster has shown, it is clear that a change in the leadership of Gopher football is necessary." Co-offensive coordinator Jeff Horton assumed the duties of head coach for the remainder of the 2010 season, leading the team to a 2-3 record and upset wins over Illinois and Iowa during his tenure as interim coach.

Mississippi State
On August 23, 2012 Brewster was hired by Mississippi State University for the position of Wide Receivers Coach, replacing Angelo Mirando.

Head coaching record

References

External links
 Florida profile

1960 births
Living people
American football tight ends
College football announcers
Denver Broncos coaches
Florida Gators football coaches
Florida State Seminoles football coaches
Illinois Fighting Illini football players
National Football League announcers
Mississippi State Bulldogs football coaches
North Carolina Tar Heels football coaches
Purdue Boilermakers football coaches
San Diego Chargers coaches
Texas Longhorns football coaches
Texas A&M Aggies football coaches
High school football coaches in Indiana
Phillipsburg High School (New Jersey) alumni
People from Phillipsburg, New Jersey